The Nandi Award for Best Supporting Actress was institute since 1981:

See also
 Nandi Awards
 Cinema of Andhra Pradesh

References

Supporting Actress
Film awards for supporting actress